Fabiano Cezar Viegas or simply Fabiano (born August 4, 1975 in Getúlio Vargas-RS), is a Brazilian central defender. He currently plays for SHEC .

After 5 months without a club, he signed a contract until 30 September 2008 in May 2008.

Club statistics

Honours
Tournament Rio - São Paulo: 1993
Rio de Janeiro State League: 1996, 1999
Japanese League: 2000, 2001
Nabisco Cup: 2000, 2002
Emperor Cup: 2000
Goiás State League: 2006

External links
 CBF
 sambafoot
 Guardian Stats Centre
 zerozero.pt

1975 births
Living people
Brazilian footballers
Brazil under-20 international footballers
Brazilian expatriate footballers
Campeonato Brasileiro Série A players
CR Flamengo footballers
Club Athletico Paranaense players
Brazilian expatriate sportspeople in China
Fabiano
Fabiano
Fabiano
Expatriate footballers in Japan
Goiás Esporte Clube players
Expatriate footballers in China
Wuhan Guanggu players
Qingdao Hainiu F.C. (1990) players
Association football central defenders